The Great South Pacific Express was a luxury Australian train service, run in by Queensland Rail and Venice-Simplon Orient Express.

History
In December 1996, Queensland Rail announced it would enter a joint venture with Venice-Simplon Orient Express to operate a luxury tourist train between Kuranda (near Cairns) and Sydney. It commenced operating in April 1999. The train accommodated 100 passengers in up to 21 carriages, at a cost of $3,500 to $5,500 depending on type of accommodation. The train also made occasional excursions to Canberra, the Blue Mountains and the Hunter Region.

The service ceased in June 2003, having run up losses of around $12 million over four years.

After the demise of the service the carriages were sold to Orient-Express Hotels for an undisclosed price in 2005, for use on their trains overseas. 20 of the carriages remained in storage at the North Ipswich Railway Workshops, with Queensland Rail stating an Orient Express holding company owned them, while an Orient Express Hotels manager in London said they were still owned by Queensland Rail.

In 2013, the Queensland Government approached the Venice-Simplon Orient Express for permission to operate the remaining carriages on tours in Queensland.

In February 2016, the carriages were moved from the Workshops Rail Museum at Ipswich to the Port of Brisbane for shipment to Peru where they will be used by the Orient Express Hotels' successor, Belmond, and its partly-owned railroad company PeruRail. The train entered service in May 2017 as Belmond Andean Explorer, carrying passengers from Cusco to Puno (at the Lake Titicaca) and to Arequipa.

Rolling stock

The 21 carriages were built at the Queensland Rail workshops in Townsville for $35 million.

The train consisted of sleeping cars in three different comfort levels (Pullman, State and Commissioner Suites), two dining cars, two bar cars (one of them with an open-air observation deck), a power car and staff sleepers. The entire train layout was designed similar to the Eastern and Oriental Express, but with a different interior style.

References

Further reading
Great South Pacific Express Beckhaus, John Australian Railway Historical Society Bulletin, June 1998 pp232–238
Great South Pacific Express Short, Col Australian Railway Historical Society Bulletin, December 2000 pp 443–455

Named passenger trains of Australia
Railway services introduced in 1999
Railway services discontinued in 2003
1999 establishments in Australia
2003 disestablishments in Australia
Discontinued railway services in Australia